Dioscorea amaranthoides is a herbaceous vine in the genus Dioscorea. It is found in Bolivia, Brazil, Paraguay, and Peru.  
One specimen was found in the vicinity of Machu Picchu, Peru in a forested area near water.

References

amaranthoides